Jacquou le Croquant is a 1969 French miniseries in 6 episodes: five 90-minute episodes and one 120-minute episode. The series was directed by Stellio Lorenzi and aired from October 4, 1969 to November 8, 1969 on Office de radiodiffusion télévision française channel 1.

It was based on Eugène Le Roy's 1899 novel of the same name which was based on 19th-century peasant revolts in Southwest France.

Plot 
1819: Jacquou Féral is an 8-year-old boy in the Périgord region of France. His father, Martin Féral, also called Martissou, is a tenant farmer for the Count of Nansac, who lives in Château de l'Herm and exploits peasants under contract to him. Nansac's steward, Laborie, doubles the Féral family's dues on a whim, and when his wife, Marie, successfully negotiates back to the original dues, Laborie then accuses Martin of illegally owning a hunting dog. Laborie kills the dog, his bullet ricocheting and injuring Marie, at which Martin, furious, kills Laborie. Aware of the potential consequences, Martin escapes into the nearby forest, leaving his family at the farm.

Nansac eventually has Martin Féral sent to prison, where he dies. Meanwhile, he evicts Marie and Jacquou, and seizes their sheep and remaining wheat, effectively condemning them to poverty and itinerancy. In time, Marie dies of hunger and sorrow. Jacquou, now an orphan, is taken in by the parish priest Bonnal, who gives the young man an education. As an adult, Jacquou continues fighting the injustice brought on his family, and dreams of avenging them. As increasing numbers of peasants are no longer able to survive the harsh rule of landowners, Jacquou leads a peasant rebellion against Nansac. His desire for revenge is transformed into a fight for justice, in which he proves that a simple "croquant", which means "yokel", is the equal of lords and ladies.

Cast 
 Eric Damain: Jacquou Féral, child
 Daniel Le Roy: Jacquou, adult
 Claude Cerval: Count of Nansac
 Simone Rieutor: Marie Féral
 Fred Ulysse: Martin Féral
 Elisabeth Wiener: Galiote de Nansac
 Paloma Matta: Lina
 Isabelle Ferrand: Bertille
 Francis Claude: Galibert
 Henri Nassiet: Bonnal parish priest
 Noël Roquevert: La Ramée
 François Vibert: Cassius
 Héléna Bossis: La Mathive
 Robert Bazil: Jean
 Lucien Barjon: Geral
 Luce Fabiole: Fantille
 Denis Manuel: Lawyer Fontgrave
 Yvon Sarray: Don Engelbert
 Fred Personne: Villar parish priest
 Étienne Several: Guilhem
 Charles Moulin: Laborie
 Jacques Danoville: Mascret
 Edmond Ardisson: Antoine
 Lucien Hubert: President
 Charles Blavette: Jansou
 Douchka: Jeannette Mion
 Maurice Bourbon: Pierre Mion
 Jeanne Hardeyn: La Mion
 Roger Desmares: Marc
 Gilles Léger: Joseph
 Maria Verdi: Madeleine
 Pascal Tersou: Le Garde
 Séverine : Hermine
 Pierre Nunzi: son of Nansac
 Vanina Wanitzki: Lina, child
 Hervé Sand: Brigadier
 Raymond Pélissier: Prosecutor
 Léonce Corne: Bars parish priest
 Marcel Dedieu: Secretary
 Martin Trévières: Gendarme
 Gérard Dournel: Clerk
 Jacques Robiolles: Jesuit
 A.M. Julien: Judge
 Gilbert Beugniot: Court clerk
 Pierre Duncan: Executioner
 Paul Leroyer: Bailiff
 Guy Vassal: Young man

Production 
 Title: Jacquou le Croquant
 Director: Stellio Lorenzi
 Written by: Stellio Lorenzi et Michèle O'Glor, based on Eugène Le Roy's novel 
 Music composed by: Georges Delerue
 Photography: Roger Dormoy et Jean Graglia
 Editing: Claude Dufour et Paul Loizon 
 Sets: Jacques Chalvet
 Costumes: Christiane Coste
 Sound: Jacques Merrien

List of episodes 
 Les Métayers des Nansac
 La Nuit de la Chandeleur
 La Tuilière
 Le Curé Bonnal
 La Révolte de Fanlac
 1830

Novel 
Eugène Le Roy's novel of the same name was published in 1899, itself based on true events of 19th-century peasant revolts in Southwest France. The story occurs in 1815 in the Périgord region.

Videography 
  zone 2 : Jacquou le Croquant, May 15, 2002, ASIN B00006471B
  zone 2 : Jacquou le croquant, TF1 Vidéo, 2002, 3 DVDs, EAN 3-384442-021654.

Notes

References

External links 
 
 All 6 episodes of Jacquou le Croquant are available on ina.fr 
 
 Jacquou, der Rebell

1969 French television series debuts
1969 French television series endings
1960s French television miniseries
Television series set in the 1810s
1960s French television series
Television shows based on French novels